Sande Station is a railway station on the Vestfold Line in Sande, Norway. The station is served with regional trains on the RE11 line operated by Vy.

The station opened originally in 1881, but a new station was built in 2001 as part of the new Vestfold Line through Sande.

References

External links

Bane NOR entry on Sande Station

Railway stations in Vestfold og Telemark
Railway stations on the Vestfold Line
Railway stations opened in 1881
1881 establishments in Norway
Sande, Vestfold